"Skating Away on the Thin Ice of the New Day" is a song by British progressive rock band Jethro Tull. It was released on their album War Child in 1974. Written as a comment on global cooling for the band's aborted "Chateau D'isaster" album, the song was reworked in 1974 for War Child.

The song was released as a single in 1975 and reached number 75 on the Cashbox charts in the US. Despite its limited chart success, the song has seen positive critical reception from music writers and has appeared on several compilation albums.

Background
"Skating Away on the Thin Ice of the New Day" was written by Jethro Tull frontman Ian Anderson, who dubbed it his "first climate change song" due to its lyrics about the then-current concern over global cooling. He later explained,

Like other songs on War Child, "Skating Away on the Thin Ice of the New Day" was initially written as part of the "Chateau D'isaster Tapes", an early version of A Passion Play. An early version appears on the 2014 re-release of A Passion Play as a bonus track.

Release
"Skating Away on the Thin Ice of the New Day" was first released as on the War Child album in 1974. After the success of the album's lead-off single, "Bungle in the Jungle", in the US, "Skating Away on the Thin Ice of the New Day" was released as a follow-up in the US and Germany in 1975. The B-side of the single was "Sealion". It did not chart in Germany or on the Billboard charts in America, though it did reach number 75 on the Cashbox charts in the US.

The song has since appeared on several compilation albums, including M.U. – The Best of Jethro Tull, Original Masters, The Best of Jethro Tull – The Anniversary Collection, The Best of Acoustic Jethro Tull, and The Essential. The song was also a live favorite, appearing live on albums such as Bursting Out and on the concert video Slipstream.

Reception
"Skating Away on the Thin Ice of the New Day" has received praise from critics, who generally note the song as one of the highlights of War Child. In a 1975 review, Cash Box said that "opening with acoustical guitar and Ian Anderson's distinctive vocal, the song grows slowly into a cute, catchy arrangement and ends upbeat and uplifting" and praised the song's "great form and a perfect sense of balance." Retrospective reviews have been similarly positive—Bruce Eder of Allmusic called the track "a beautiful, largely acoustic number" while the same site's Daniel de Visé called it "the sparkling standout" of War Child and "a gorgeous acoustic song dressed up into a pop hit." Ryan Reed of Ultimate Classic Rock wrote that the song "ranks among the most essential Tull pieces". Eric Senich of WRKI ranked the song the seventh best Jethro Tull song, praising the "amazing acoustic guitar work" on the track. Chuck Darrow of Bettors Insider called the song "classic". PopMatters critic David Pike rated it one of the "41 essential pop/rock songs with accordion."

References

1975 singles
1974 songs
Jethro Tull (band) songs
Song recordings produced by Ian Anderson
Songs written by Ian Anderson
Chrysalis Records singles